The following is a list of notable and recurring characters featured in the manga series Spriggan written by Hiroshi Takashige and illustrated by Ryōji Minagawa. The story takes place during the last years of the Cold War, when mysterious objects called out-of-place artifacts are discovered in various parts of the world. The discoveries lead to a secret war against the ARCAM Corporation, an organization which has placed itself as the guardian of the OOPArts to prevent them from being used as weapons.

Protagonists

Yu Ominae 
 is the main protagonist, stationed at ARCAM's Japanese branch. He is also a former member of COSMOS. He is known for being a high school delinquent to his teachers and classmates, but he is also secretly a special Spriggan agent for the international conglomerate ARCAM Corporation. As such, Yu gets thrown into missions in and out of Japan when out-of-place artifacts are involved in a mission.

Yu is called upon by ARCAM to conduct black ops for the company, which results in several disruptions from his studies. His most dangerous mission to date was to be deployed into the South Pole in order to eliminate the South Pole Shrine. After the successful operation in eliminating the rampaging Fire Snakes from the South Pole Shrine and defeating Markson's Trident forces in the South Pole, Yu was seen attending college after graduating from his high school. He is still posted at ARCAM's Japanese branch, where he attends to a mission in Mexico in order to secure the Gold Statue of Pachacamac and ensure the safety of his classmate, Nanako Kondo.  He is voiced by Chiaki Kobayashi (Japanese) and Kyle McCarley (English) in the 2022 ONA adaptation.

Jean Jacquemonde 
 is a French Spriggan operator who is based in ARCAM's French branch. His werewolf appearance is mainly due to use of ancient biotechnology that gave him the ability to shapeshift into one. During his time with the Spriggans, he actively assists Yu Ominae in battling enemies of the ARCAM Corporation from Turkey all the way to the forests of Japan while fighting foes from Machiner's Platoon soldiers to brainwashed COSMOS child soldiers. In his first appearance in Turkey, Jean has his first werewolf transformation when Little Boy riddles him with a barrage of bullets. Eventually killing his assailant in his werewolf stage, Jean overcomes platoons of Machiner's Platoon soldiers sent to stop him.

When Jean is deployed to Romania on a mission, he confronts his father who told him of his heritage. In an operation in Ecuador, Jean is severely wounded by Oboro and left for dead. Fortunately for Jean, Percup Ramdi performs an operation that manages to heal Jean of his wounds and further accelerates his rate of self-healing. In a mission to prevent COSMOS from extracting Rie Yamabishi to the US, Jean storms a US Army base in Japan along with Yu and Oboro. However, they are unable to prevent COSMOS forces from escaping.

Jean, grudgingly, teams up with Iwao Akatsuki and Bo Brantz, two of ARCAM's most fearsome enemies, in sabotaging a Trident operation when Larry Markson attempted to harness the power of the South Pole Shrine in order to take control of the world. With Bo's death, the three took on Larry's forces before they were able to get rid of the Fire Snake with the help of Yoshino Somei, Rie Yamabishi and other ARCAM personnel who were forced to assist Trident in gaining access to the fiery artifact.  He is voiced by Yōhei Azakami (Japanese) and Xander Mobus (English) in the 2022 ONA adaptation.

Tea Flatte 
, whose real name is Tea Flatte Arcam, is a British Spriggan operator stationed in ARCAM's British headquarters. Born in Britain during the times of the wizard Merlin, he bestowed upon her immortality and made her go out and protect Alien Artifacts from being used for the wrong purposes. Tea possesses a special ability called "Calling Beast" that allows her to summon illusions to fool enemies into insecurity and have their souls drained. She first participates in Romania for an assignment with Yu and the others to investigate what Trident agents were doing in the country. Later on, she is dispatched to Britain to subdue a group of Neo-Nazi militants that are trying to secure the Holy Grail. She teams up with Yu and Yoshino in defeating Kutheimer's group when the Adolf Hitler clone attempts to use the Vajrayana scepter after her and the other ARCAM agents and Yoshino before it blew up due to its overuse. Tea later participates, in a side role, in assisting Yu's infiltration of the S.S. Eugenio E to recover the Ark of the Covenant, which was captured by Trident operator Sidewinder.

Oboro 
 is a skilled Qigong martial artist and is capable of paralyzing his opponents with a single touch, known as Dim Mak. Oboro is called on by the ARCAM Corporation to infiltrate a Neo-Nazi faction in Egypt. His cover is responsible for helping Yu and Suzuko Kawahara neutralize Kutheimer's operations in Egypt. Oboro later participates with Yu in a mission to Iraq to protect Sister Kate, who had the Apocrypha of Rockis, which cultists from the Magier Heunri Balez wanted to use in conjuring demons. Later on, Oboro returns to Thailand and assists Yu and Yoshino in fighting against Cheng, who had honed his Qigong skills in order to seek revenge against Oboro.

Later, Oboro apparently betrays ARCAM due to his attacking an ARCAM Special Private Army detachment in Pakistan and is able to defeat Jean Jacquemonde in his werewolf form, thereby placing him in critical status. An enraged Yu defeats Oboro in single combat, but Oboro walks away with bruises on his face while smiling at his former student. However, towards the end of the manga, he assists Yu in disabling Trident's communications with Takashi, which prevents Larry Markson from calling in additional reinforcements to the South Pole. In the 2022 ONA adaptation, he is voiced by Takehito Koyasu in Japanese and Bill Rogers in English.

Antagonists

Iwao Akatsuki 
First appearing in the Forest of No Return chapter,  states that he wishes to team up with Yu Ominae and escape the forest. Although Yu sees him as an enemy as ARCAM and Trident were battling for control of the out-of-place artifacts, the two eventually work together with Yoshino Somei to escape the cursed forest.

Iwao later appears in Romania as part of a Trident taskforce to eliminate Yu and other Spriggans. Although Larry Markson orders the destruction of the medieval fortress used to lure the Spriggans in, Iwao comes into the rubble and rescued Yu, showing that he has a sense of honor. He is later placed in charge of the SS Eugenio E, which is secretly transporting the Ark of the Covenant. After encountering Yu again, the two join forces once again to see what the Ark had to offer and to ensure the safety of the civilians when Sidewinder retrieves the Ark.

Nearing the end of the series, Iwao is targeted for termination alongside Yu, Jean Jacquemonde, and Bo Brantz by COSMOS forces. After the death of Bo, the trio venture on to the South Pole, where they disrupt Larry Markson's plans to militarize the use of the South Pole Shrine. In the 2022 ONA adaptation, he is voiced by Yoshimasa Hosoya in Japanese and Kaiji Tang in English.

Bo Brantz 
A secret agent for a Neo-Nazi faction based in Egypt,  served as Kutheimer's chief bodyguard  in his organization. Though his fighting skills were impressive, it is merely the result of his use of steroids. This proves to be a disadvantage against Yu Ominae and Oboro since the two were able to outwit him. Eventually, Oboro paralyzes Bo, but also encourages Bo to retrain himself and forget his usage of steroids.

Yu later encounters Bo again during an operation to recover the Holy Grail from Kutheimer. This time, Bo has retrained himself without the use of steroids, but is still unable to defeat Yu. Bo later encounters Yu, Tea Flatte, and Yoshino Somei in the secret cave where the Vajrayana was kept. However, when the Vajrayana explodes due to psychic overload from the Adolf Hitler clone, the cave is destroyed and Bo is one of the few survivors.

Realizing that he has no place to go, Bo joins Trident where he forms a steady alliance with Iwao Akatsuki. On the SS Eugenio E, he fights with Yu for the last time before teaming up with him to save the passengers. Nearing the end of the series, Bo teams up with Iwao to fight off COSMOS after the two are targeted for termination by Trident. Although they are able to stop COSMOS with the help of Yu and Jean Jacquemonde, Bo is critically wounded and later dies from his injuries. In the 2022 ONA adaptation, Bo is voiced by Tetsu Inada in Japanese and Kyle Hebert in English.

Larry Markson 
 is an influential figure in Trident Corporation, allowing him to gain access to assets in various national militaries in order to claim out-of-place artifacts for military purposes. Markson first appears in Romania in an operation to confront the Spriggan agents that were assembling there. Though Trident's forces were defeated by the Spriggans, Markson is satisfied that the Spriggans were driven off. As the series progressed, he gains the cooperation of ARCAM's President, Henry Garnum, in securing the relics from the South Pole, including the ability to use the South Pole Shrine. Although he has the initial cooperation from ARCAM personnel, Iwao Akatsuki—who had been targeted for termination by Markson, Yu Ominae, and Jean Jacquemonde arrive and foil Markson's attempt to unleash the Fire Snake. Markson is voiced in the 2022 ONA series by Ryōta Takeuchi in English.

Henry Garnum 
 is the president of ARCAM Corporation. During his time, he builds a shadow coalition of supporters within ARCAM and creates contacts with Trident leader Larry Markson. After taking control of ARCAM's field operations, he orders Rie Yamabishi, Professor Mayzel, Ms. Margaret, Yamamoto, Percup Ramdi and Eva McMahon to the South Pole to assist Trident in excavating and studying the artifacts, including the potential military use of the South Pole Shrine. However, his operation came to an end when Yu, Jean and Iwao took the initiative to stop him and his alliance with Larry. Supported by Yoshino Somei and by Oboro and Takashi Ominae behind the enemy lines, they were able to quell any attempts to use the Fire Snake to bring world domination.

Sho Kanaya 
 is deployed into Yu's school secretly to locate him on the orders of Colonel Khoury. He is able to fool many of the school's student and faculty body that he was a regular student. Though Yu Ominae is able to uncover his real identity when he notes the reactions of his classmates on the scars found on his back when he changed his shirt, Sho wounds Yu with a knife when he confronts him alone at the school's rooftop before detonating C4 explosives as he escapes. Yu manages to escape the explosion with minor injuries. Before leaving, he mocks Yu by addressing him under his old COSMOS codename, Number 43.

Later on, he leads a mission with several COSMOS platoons in raiding ARCAM Japan's headquarters and kidnapping Rie Yamabishi and Akiha Ominae to lure the Spriggans from hiding as they were an obstacle in the US Army's attempt to locate and study the pieces of the Mappa mundi. Though it is a failure, Sho mets up with an unknown man during his escape.

While in the hands of the Trident Corporation, Sho is augmented so as to increase his psychic powers in communicating with his fellow COSMOS soldiers. With it he orders the platoon leader to commit suicide since his unit was being overwhelmed by the combined forces of Yu Ominae, Jean Jacquemonde, Iwao Akatsuki and Bo Brantz. He latter tosses his psychic headband that connects his mind onto a computer used to help increase his augmentation strength after a failed assassination mission, indicating his frustration with Larry Markson and the others.

Other characters

Yamamoto 
Head of the ARCAM Corporation's Japanese branch,  took in Yu Ominae in as a ward  after he found out that Yu was a former COSMOS child soldier. Yamamoto trained Yu in military and guerrilla tactics in order to let him be activated as a Spriggan  agent while being his handler. He was responsible for calling Rie Yamabishi back to Japan after learning that she was related to Yu Ominae due to their history.

Yamamoto became more and more involved with the company when he fought against COSMOS soldiers from raiding the interior of ARCAM's Japanese headquarters. Later on, he was forced to work with Henry Garnum when he went to the South Pole with Rie Yamabishi and other ARCAM personnel so as to harness the power of the Fire Snake from the South Pole Shrine. At the last minute, he and the others turned on Henry Garnum and Larry Markson, defeating their forces stationed in Antarctica and quelling the Fire Snake before it went out of control. In anime film, he is voiced by Kinryu Arimoto in Japanese and John Paul Shephard in English. He is voiced by Kenji Hamada (Japanese) and Greg Chun (English) in the 2022 ONA adaptation.

Rie Yamabishi 
 is a childhood friend of Yu Ominae during their orphanage days. She is a child prodigy who graduates from Cornell University by the age of 16. She returns to Japan after receiving a report from Yamamoto that Yu Ominae had been "spotted" somewhere in the country with a request to investigate the Fire Orb. However, she is targeted by CIA agents after arriving in New Tokyo International Airport. Rescued by Yu in time before she could be transported to a CIA safehouse, Rie is brought back to ARCAM's Japanese headquarters. She is targeted again by soldiers of the US Armored Corps. after a squadron of them infiltrats ARCAM's Japanese headquarters building by brute force while maintaining stealth. Yu once again came to her rescue and subdues them. Later on, she is targeted by Spetsnaz forces in the Japanese countryside led by Japanese KGB agent Koichi Moroha. Initially thought to be dead when she was trapped in the Fire Orb temple, she is found to be safe since the area was built to withstand intense heat. 

After decoding some of the Mappa mundi to locate other out-of-place artifacts, Rie is once again targeted for kidnapping. This time by COSMOS stages a daring night raid on ARCAM's Japanese main branch and kidnaps her and Akiha Ominae, Yu's adopted sister, as a means to lure out Yu and the other Spriggans in order to eliminate them. However, the two are soon rescued.

Nearing the end of the series, Rie was "forced" to head to the South Pole and work on accessing the Fire Snake with Yoshino's help to find a way in using it from within the South Pole Shrine. However, she and some of the others, including Dr. Ramdi, Yamamoto and Yoshino Somei had decided to resist Larry Markson's efforts to use the fiery beast and release it from the South Pole. She is voiced by Mitsuho Kambe (Japanese) and Xanthe Huynh (English) in the 2022 ONA adaptation.

Yoshino Somei 
 first appearance was in the one shot story "Spriggan: First Mission", where Yoshino infiltrates a Machiner's Platoon research center in Japan in order to obtain the Megiddo Flame. There, she encounters Yu Ominae, who is also there to obtain the Megiddo Flame.

Yoshino latter appears in the Forest of No Return chapter, trying to steal the Rama sculpture. Lost in the cursed forest with Yu Ominae after pissing him off for doing a stunt, the two eventually were forced to join forces with Iwao Akatsuki, in order to eliminate the forest's curse. During an operation to acquire the Holy Grail, she is critically injured from a gunshot wound, however she is saved by the Adolf Hitler clone's good personality before it was overwhelmed by his evil personality.

Yoshino again teams up with Yu to investigate Phantom Island to locate out-of-place artifacts. However, they encounter Trident's agent and Yu's former combat instructor, Bowman. The two escape from the island before it disappears once again under a space/time continuum. Yoshino then continues to fight alongside Yu, Oboro, and other ARCAM staff members in Thailand, Japan, and eventually the South Pole. At the South Pole, she is recruited to harness the power hidden from the South Pole Shrine before she uses her necromancy powers to sabotage Trident's operations in the region. She is voiced by Mariya Ise (Japanese) and Jenny Yokobori (English) in the 2022 ONA adaptation.

Mayzel 
 first appeared in Turkey, having been sent to the Mount Ararat research facility by ARCAM in order to decipher thy mystery regarding Noah's Ark and whether it can be opened. He was able to enter the Ark after Colonel MacDougal was able to convince him to go with him or he would execute any ARCAM personnel still alive. Mayzel was goaded by MacDougal to use the Ark and wipe out all life on Earth, but resisted his offer. He was later rescued by Yu and Jean when they penetrated the Ark's interior and left Yu to battle the psychotic Machiner's Platoon commander before committing suicide by using the Ark's self-destruct system.

Mayzel is not seen later in the Spriggan series until the last few chapters, where he was deployed to the South Pole alongside Margaret and several others including Rie Yamabishi, Eva McMahon and Yoshino Somei in investigating the South Pole Shrine. Unfortunately for Henry Garnum and Larry Markson, he and the others decided to revolt against them and tried to assist Yu, Jean and the Trident defector Iwao Akatsuki in seizing Trident operations in the South Pole.

Minor characters

ARCAM

Steve H. Foster
He assists Yu in his Spriggan operations, thrice against the Trident Corporation by allowing him to use his ship mostly as transport for him. He has a scar on his left eye and wears glasses with a bandanna tied on his head. He is one of the few ARCAM personnel to know about Tea's secret heritage]as he and Tea were former lovers. He is voiced by Akio Ōtsuka in the 2022 ONA series.

Akiha Ominae
 is Yu's cousin/sister and guardian, she took him into her care with her father, Takashi Ominae, when she found out about what happened to Yu's parents back in Iran. She confronted him for the first time in Japan after receiving news from Yamamoto in ARCAM's Japanese headquarters. She was captured by COSMOS operatives when the ARCAM Japanese branch was attacked with Rie. During their captivity, she told him about Yu's secret past and how she found out that something was "wrong" with Yu. Later on, she was employed in the United States as Henry Garnum's personal secretary. Though before it happened, she told Yu about Garnum himself and his links with ARCAM. She was most likely employed in order to keep her cousin brother and others in line with him.

Miss Margaret
 is Professor Mayzel's assistant, the two have been working together since the two were recruited by ARCAM Corporation to work on their Omihalcon-enhanced devices, such as the Armored Muscle Suit. In the anime, she is voiced by Sakiko Tamagawa in Japanese and Kelly Manison in English.

Jimmy Max
 is an American operative under ARCAM's Special Private Army (ASPA), he teamed up with Yu in retaking ARCAM's R&D center in the United States after the YAMA virus had brainwashed ARCAM's civilian personnel to kill anyone who tries to intrude inside. Though heavily wounded, he survives and was treated for his injuries. He has his own team called the "Max Team" from the ranks of the ASPA.

Precup Ramdi
 is A Spriggan working as a doctor in Thailand. Also known as "The Hand of God", a renowned assassin during his younger age. Despite with his older appearance, he hates by calling himself "gramps" instead of "doctor".

Professor Eva McMahon
 is Yu's History Lecturer and a member from ARCAM Foundation Archaeology Research Department.

In the last chapter, she also joined the ARCAM Researchers to fight and protect the earth from Fire Snake's attack.

Bowman
 is a former knife instructor in the Spriggans before moving onto Trident, he taught Yu the basics on knife combat. He was sent by Larry Markson to kill his former pupil in Phantom Island and recover a Message Plate on the island, though he later died of his injuries sustained during knife combat. He is voiced by Takayuki Sugō in the 2022 ONA adaptation.

British Military

Maria Clemente
 is one of the British army's youngest officers, graduating from MIT at the age of 20 and enlisted in the army with the rank of Lieutenant-Colonel, she was responsible for procuring the Berserker for military research from Professor Mauser, who then developed a grudge for the British military. She assisted Yu in defeating Mauser and eliminating the Berserker, not before she sustained a shot in her stomach. She had survived the attack, whose wound was believed to be treated by Yu Ominae before being rescued by British soldiers. She is voiced by Saori Hayami in the 2022 ONA adaptation.

Professor Mauser
 is a research scientist who had enlisted the help of the British army in securing the remains of the Berserker from an excavation site in rural Britain.  He developed a hatred for the British military after Lieutenant-Colonel Maria Clemente had taken the Berserker away from them. He tolerated the attack of the Berserker when it was awakened after some electrical oscillations were used on it. He died when Maria turned his pistol against him during a fight in the main control room, killing the enraged scientist.

Electy

Ed Kruger
 is a former ARCAM research scientist. He was lured over to Ryang's Electy organization with promise of money and fame after he was responsible for turning Ambrosia that Electy had cultivated into Soma drugs. When Yu, Yoshino, Oboro and Percup teamed up to wreck Electy's base in the mountains of Thailand, Ed chose to commit suicide instead of being captured alive.

Lyan
 is a Thai national who created Electy, his organization had managed to cultivate Ambrosia into Soma, a drug that could enhance a person to be immortal temporarily. His operation was destroyed by a combined force consisting of Yu, Yoshino, Oboro and Percup. He attempted to fight Percup by using the Soma, but Percup defeated him by taking his heart out with fast speed, instantly killing him.

Machiner's Platoon

Colonel McDougal
 is a child who was partially cyberized by MJ-12. A psychic amplifier was implanted in his brain that enables him to use psychokinetic powers. He is feared in the organization for his deadly abilities, though if he stresses these powers too much, it causes painful backlashes.

In the film, McDougal masks his true personality with his young appearance. He is the main antagonist of the film. He is actually quite sinister and thinks of himself as a god, his ultimate goal was to gain control over the Ark and use it to recreate the world as he saw fit. His first step to achieve this was to kill off all of humanity with the Ark's weather-controlling capabilities. He was defeated by Yu, but not killed, so he committed suicide by activating Noah's Ark self-destruct mode. In the anime film, he is voiced by Ryuji Aigase in Japanese and Kevin Corn in English.  He is voiced by Ayumu Murase in the 2022 ONA adaptation.

Fatman
 is a Machiner's Platoon operative wearing an Omihalcon suit, he carries a M61 Vulcan machine gun on his arms with a drum barrel on his back. He was wounded by Yu's Omihalcon combat knife in Turkey during the raid on ARCAM's Turkish research center. Jean ended his life by firing his Franchi SPAS-12 shotgun into Fatman's face.

In anime film, Major Fatman used to be Yu's Commander in COSMOS. He's not killed by Jean, instead he's killed by Yu caused by his uncontrolled quiet rage. Fatman is voiced by Kenji Takano in Japanese and Mike Kleihenz in English.

Little Boy
 is an operative for the Machiner's Platoon, he was the sidekick of Fatman in the attack on ARCAM's Turkish research center and slaughtered ARCAM Defense Unit soldiers with the help of fiber wires that he uses from his arm-mounted mini-howitzer launcher. Little Boy is killed by Jean when he turns into a lycanthrope. Like Fatman, he too wears an Omihalcon suit.
In anime film, he's not killed by Jean instead he trapped in the truck and finally caught and dead by explosion. Little Boy is voiced by Katsumi Suzuki in  Japanese and Spike Spencer in English.

Humming Bat
 is a Machiner's Platoon operative of American origin with the rank of Major, he was said to be involved in Angola during his mercenary days before having his original arms replaced with cybernetic ones. His hands emit foggy smoke and deafening ultra sound waves that forces his opponents to cover their ears in order to prevent them from being deaf. Humming Bat was not affected since his cranial nerve was badly damaged during his mercenary days that the ultra sound waves barely affect him at all, though he can hear and comprehend human conversation. He is also an expert combat knife user, since he prefers to toss them by throwing them at his targets. Humming Bat was also ruthless when he executed several of his research staff member with his pistol and combat knife after discovering the powers of the Megiddo Flame. He, however, was taken out by Yu Ominae when he punched him hard since the windows nearby broke off due to the high pitch of the sounds emitting from his hands. Humming Bat's arms were lopped off his limbs after being defeated by Yu.

Neo-Nazis

Kutheimer
 is a former officer in Nazi Germany with the rank of Colonel, he escaped from the Allied advance to Berlin and settled as a corporate official in Egypt, waiting for the day that he would be able to oust the current German government and prop up a fascist regime. He was paralyzed by Oboro during a scuffle in the desert that confined him to a wheelchair. His face was scarred on the left side, possibly during his days in the German Army back in World War II. He was killed when a shockwave from the Vajrayana struck him, unable to escape due to his crippled state.

Adolf Hitler
Unlike the real , the Spriggan interpretation explains that he had two split personalities; one was a peaceful one and the other one was the one that the entire world knew him for. Upon placing his soul on a Hitler clone, it lost its memory and had the peaceful personality in place. However, it reverted to the evil personality when Kutheimer invoked the Sieg Heil chant on it in order to have the evil persona on the clone's mind. The Hitler clone had the ability to regenerate its wounds and heal other people's injuries. It died when the Vajrayana exploded due to psychic overload, weakening him back to his peaceful persona before the Neo-Nazis hideout was destroyed.

Hans Schneider
 is an assassin recruited by Kutheimer to eliminate Shozo Kawahara and his expedition in Egypt in acquiring the Crystal Skull for him by dismembering him alive. He attempted to do the same thing to Suzuko, only when Oboro intervened in time to save him. Yu later fought him and kicked him out a building by tossing him from a few stories up the ground, falling to his death.

Trident Corporation

Hedgehog
 is a Trident officer with glasses and blonde hair. He is known to have a prosthetic right arm as his removable hand conceals a needle gun, firing powerful shots enough to critically injure a human or destroy an object.
In the last combat against Yu, he'd been attacked by Takashi but failed until his arms finally sliced down by Yu caused his arrogant personality.

Jack the Ripper
 is one of the most dangerous Trident field operatives, his two original arms were replaced by cybernetic arms that conceal Omihalcon High Frequency blades from his arms that act like swords with Omihalcon blades from his knuckles. He was seriously wounded by Yu during an operation in Mali, but was able to escape. He is the fourth member to receive the Armored Machine Suit.

Sidewinder
 is a cyborg from the ranks of the Trident Corporation. His robotic hands on his cybernetic arms conceal several sharp steel dart heads that are fired from the fingertips of the prosthetic hands. He is the fifth bearer of the Armored Machine Suit.

Dary Graham
The only non-human and vampire operative of Trident,  sucks the life out of his helpless victim, deteriorating them to a state of death, with the appearance of a malnourished person. He fights with a combat knife and his vampiric skills include teleportation and the regeneration of wounds sustained in battle. He is the only Trident Corporation super soldier operative not to wear the Armored Machine Suit. His vampiric appearance, skills and his regeneration abilities are mainly due to biotechnology, while his healing powers were improved by Trident. He generally looks down on normal people because of his biological lineage. He was last seen trapped in another alternate dimension, being placed there by Tea Flatte.

Thunderbolt
 is a Trident operative who had cybernetic arms similar to Humming Bat, his hands emit electrical charges that are similar to thunder bolts. He attempted to interfere with Yu's mission to safeguard the Gold Statue of Pachacamac. Like Humming Bat, he was defeated when his right hand is lopped off by Yu's Omihalcon knife before he knocked him out with a punch to his face. Seeing that he was defeated, Thunderbolt allowed himself to walk away, knowing that he had failed his mission.

Civilians

Kate
 is a nun who was based in Italy, she was the target of Heunri Balez for the possession of the Apocrypha of Rockis as one of the main objects needed in the Reverse Babel Tower in Iraq. Assisting Yu and Oboro in defeating the small cult, she was wounded in a gunfight between Israeli and Western special forces and Iraqi soldiers due to the confusion that the two sides had seen when the tower collapsed.

Tanaka
 is an exclusive character in the animated movie, he was one of Yu Ominae's classmates who vanished from school a few days ago. When Tanaka mysteriously showed up back in school, he had explosives strapped on his body and a hidden detonator held in his hand. Yu had tried to save him, but Tanaka had been forced, possibly by remote hypnotism, to be a suicide bomber. His actions had injured Yu, with parts of the school damaged. Yu finds out that soldiers of the American Machine Corp were the ones responsible for kidnapping Tanaka.

Felton Family

Maria Felton
 is the foster mother of Jean Jacquemonde and he was raised in downtown Paris, France when Rick Bordeau abandoned him. The death of Maria and Mark marked Jean's personal war against the Trident Corporation since Larry Markson had a hand in their deaths after they get Jean to participate as a test subject in Trident's biological weapons program.

Mark Felton
 is the biological son of Maria and foster brother of Jean. He was killed with his mother, by Trident Corp after they get Jean to participate as a test subject in Trident's biological weapons program.

Kawahara Family

Shozo Kawahara
 is a Japanese archaeologist who received ARCAM funding to conduct an excavation in Egypt. When he retrieved the Crystal Skull, his crew had been killed by local Neo-Nazi radicals before he himself died of blood loss when his limbs were being sliced off his body by Hans Schneider. His death had angered his only daughter Suzuko, who went to Egypt to gather clues on the perpetrators. Shozo's death was soon avenged when Colonel Kutheimer's Egyptian cell was neutralized.

Hiragi Sanada
 is Yu's new classmate when appeared at study tour event. She was spied by ninja gangsters led by Kenzou Nakano. When the first meet, Hatsuho felt jealousy against her. At the end of study tour event, she was rescued by Yoshino along with Hatsuho.

Suzuko Kawahara
 is the only daughter of Shozo Kawahara, she went to Egypt to privately grieve for her father, but was soon being targeted by Neo-Nazi assassins before being forced to help Yu in dismantling Kutheimer's Egyptian faction for good. She was once his substitute world history teacher in class and like the Sasahara sisters, is the only teacher to know about Yu's secret occupation. The two were close friends after their "reunion" in school. Suzuko made another appearance in the manga, supervising Yu's section during a fieldtrip away from Tokyo when she covered his tracks to track down a kidnapped student.

Yayoi Okabe
 is Yu's classmate at his high school, wanted him to participate in the annual school run when Yamamoto had summoned him for an ARCAM operation in Britain.

Takashi Ominae
 is the biological father of Akiha Ominae and uncle to Yu Ominae, he knew about Yu's semi-augmented condition when he found out that he used his commando skills to ward off robbers in his home. Though angry at this, he still helped him fight off Trident and assisted him in bringing him back to a civilized life before sending him off to Japan as a ward of Yamamoto. During a mission when Yu and Jean encountered Takashi somewhere in North America, he was armed with a Steyr AUG carbine. He is also good in setting anti-personnel traps. Nearing the end of the story, he assists Oboro in disabling Trident's communications in the South Pole so as to prevent them from calling in reinforcements.

Sasahara Family

Koichi Sasahara
 is a professor researching on the Mask of Palenque, he was possessed by Tezcatlipoca. In his possessed form, he hired a mercenary named "Iron Arm" to kill Yu Ominae and his daughters as he saw them as obstacles for him to use the mask to take over the world.

Hatsuho Sasahara
 is Yu's classmate and sister of Kagaho. She helped Yu in Mexico in order to free Kagaho from the influence of the mask and save their father from Tezcatlipoca. Due to this incident, she knew about Yu's double life aside from her sister Kagaho and Suzuko, who was their teacher.

Kagaho Sasahara
 is the younger sister of Hatsuho and friend of Yu. She was once possessed by the Mask of Palenque, before the combined efforts of Yu and Hatsuho freed her from being under the mask's control. Like her sister and teacher, she also knew of Yu's double life and keeps it as a secret between them. In her possessed state, Kagaho can hover and teleport. Her offensive skills consists of hurled energy ball projectiles. She is also invulnerable to bullets fired from firearms.

Others

Dutch "Iron Arm" Metrisk
 is a former Machiner's Platoon agent with the rank of Major, now a mercenary hired by the possessed Professor Sasahara to eliminate Yu Ominae and the Sasahara sisters. His armaments consist of a cyberized right arm that has the Heat Crasher System, a weapon that would use fire-based projectile from his metallic hand to burn or kill his enemies while the Heat Knife is a concealable knife blade hidden in a secret compartment. Iron Arm was later wounded by Yu, but Professor Sasahara turned him into a Werejaguar. Yu had killed him later with a combat knife.

Heunri Balez

 is an underground sorcerer who fights with black magic, he is accompanied with his 3 armored guardians Aqua, Desert and Shadow with heavy broadswords as their main weapon. Before he died, he revealed to Oboro, Yu, and Kate that he wanted to use the Reverse Babel Tower due to being a victim of the Holocaust and claimed that people are demons, when he told them of the Nazis.

Aqua
An armored creature who fights by using a water wave when he swings his sword, it was killed by Yu in the Iraqi desert by punching his armor out. Its helmet resembles that of a European medieval knight. Aqua was created when Balez sealed the spirit of a dead knight in order to have the armored being moving.

Desert
Another armored creature who fights by using deadly hard sand blasts when he swings his sword like Aqua. Yu defeats it by taking its head out and using its body to kill the scorpions with the sand in its body. Its helmet resemble a gas mask of sorts with its head resembling a modern military helmet with spikes. It is able to function like its fellow guardian with help from Balez' sorcery.

Shadow
The third creature from the 3 guardians with a helmet resembling a skull, he uses the Darkness spell by striking his broadsword's blade at the ground that creates a radius of certain length. Anyone caught in it would be sent to dark dimension where they would be killed off slowly. Balez and the other creatures are in the center, which protects them from the spell. Oboro kills it by bursting out of its armor as he concealed his presence from the Darkness and its angry souls, avoiding his death. The armored being was able to move on its own with Balez' sorcery.

Tony Bennett
 is a mercenary and assassin, who Yu refers with great disgust working under contract for the CIA and for the Trident Corporation before he said to have moved to ARCAM Corporation when his CIA contract had ended. He was killed by a Machiner's Platoon agent named Jack the Ripper in Mali, but was found alive until the end of the series, where Jean doused him with gasoline before flinging him into a raging fire, killing him. Before being a part of the CIA, he was said to have conducted an assassination by using a young child to hold an explosive and detonate it.

Yuan Shuanglie
His past revealed that he was defeated by Oboro during training and finally got revenge to defeat him. When Yu encountered him, he could defeat Yu easily with one punch only. At the end, Shuanglie defeated by Yu until he battered and decided to train more before he went away.

Koichi Moroha
 is a Japanese KGB agent working under its Far East Division, working around Japanese soil for the Soviet Union. He is the bearer of the Hihiirokane sword handed to his family for generations and is a moderate psychic who uses the Tornado Beast to disable or kill his opponents with winds that could dismember limbs. His search for the Fire Orb had caused him to go against his duties. Instead of securing the orb for the Soviets, he decides to harness its powers to be a dictator ruling the entire world. However, Yu kills him by punching him hard on his face, causing him to head straight into Mount Fuji's erupted lava, burning him to death.  He is voiced by Ken Narita in the 2022 ONA adaptation.

Kenzou Nakano
 is a villain ninja and also the main antagonist in Study Tour episode. He spied Yu's new classmate Hiragi and looking for Philosopher's Stone. When the students prepared to went back to school, Kenzou placed the timed bomb to destroy Yu's friends in school bus, but finally didn't exploded instead his own truck that indicated Yoshino moved the bomb under his truck quietly before Yu killed him by stomping his head.

Rick Bordeau
 is a French national who was also a lycanthrope like Jean Jacquemonde, he fought with him in Romania under Larry Markson's orders as a part of Trident Corporation's supersoldiers. After the combat against his biological son Jean, he decided to went home, far away from Jean himself caused he didn't understand about human being.

Ralph Cooley
 is an officer in the US Army, he leads the black-ops COSMOS Project that trains children for government-sanctioned black ops missions in various nations in order to conduct operations that cannot expose the United States government in gray areas such as assassinations and kidnappings. He was mortally wounded when Yu Ominae was able to regain his memory before he shot him down when he stormed Col. Cooley's mobile command post.  Ralph Cooley later surfaced, having replaced his lost left eye with an eyepatch and his cybernetic left arm. However, he was not able to utilize it fully as Yu's speed had taken its advantage on him when he cut Cooley's throat with his Omihalcon-made combat knife, instantly killing him.

Viktor Stolov
 is a Soviet soldier from the Spetsnaz in the Soviet army, he had infiltrated Japanese territory alongside a group of Spetsnaz commandos in order to locate Rie Yamabishi and force her to assist them in locating the Temple of Fire and the Fire Orb in order to give the Soviet Union its superpower status from the days of the Cold War. After realizing Koichi's intention of using the Fire Orb were against orders of the Soviet army, Viktor attempts to subdue him from using the Fire Orb for his own gains. For this, he was killed by his Tornado Beast, slicing his waist in half. Viktor later dies from the lava erupted from Mt. Fuji by the Fire Orb's powers, scorching his corpse.

Organizations

ARCAM Corporation is a company that was founded in the United States and has branches covering all countries from across the globe. Its mission is to covertly secure and destroy all ancient artifacts (items, machines, ruins, etc.) from all known enemies that may use them for their own benefit. Its breakthrough was the refinement of Orichalcum, a strong metal that was used for ARCAM's Armored Muscle Suit and Yu's combat knife. MJ-12 and Trident Corporation were able to refine their own Orichalcum suits, mostly from ARCAM's research. The spelling ARCAM is said to be a misspelling of Arkham.

ARCAM Private Army: ARCAM's paramilitary wing whose duties vary. Their main purpose is to conduct operations on various artifact locations and its aggressors, ranging from private corporate military wings to national militaries.

Spriggans: One of ARCAM Private Army's divisions, consisting of special agents recruited for covert work in hostile areas without compromising the company.

Trident Corporation: Founded by NATO as an R&D Division, it went rogue for unknown reasons and was soon declared as an illegal organization. It searches for ancient artifacts in order to refine them as potential military weapons. Currently, it is heavily funded by the European Campbell Company, American Glovers Heavy Industries and Japanese Takasumi Zaibatsu. Its greatest breakthrough, apparently based on ARCAM's Armored Muscle Suit, was the Orichalcum Armored Machine Suit. One of its users was the Trident Corp. operator Iwao Akatsuki.

COSMOS (Children Of Soldiers Machine Organic System) is a black-ops unit of the US Army. Most of its operatives are child soldiers who were kidnapped by CIA agents and US Army soldiers from around the world and brainwashed.

References

Spriggan
Characters